Girls' Night Out, Girls Night Out, Girls' Nite Out, or Girls Nite Out may refer to:

Film and television

Film
 Girls Nite Out (1982 film), an American slasher film
 Girls' Night Out (1998 film), a South Korean erotic drama
 Girl's Night Out (2015 film), a Spanish comedy
 Girls' Night Out (2017 film) or Rough Night, an American dark comedy

Television episodes
 "Girls' Night Out" (Ally McBeal), 2000
 "Girls' Night Out" (Danny Phantom), 2007
 "Girls Night Out" (The Flash), 2017
 "Girls' Night Out" (The New Batman Adventures), 1998
 "Girls' Night Out" (SpongeBob SquarePants), 2018

Music

Albums
 Girls' Night Out (Toronto album) or the title song, 1983
 Girls Nite Out (Tyler Collins album) or the title song (see below), 1989
 Girls Night Out, by Candy Dulfer, 1999
 Girls Night Out, by Babyface, 2022

Songs
 "Girls Night Out" (Charli XCX song), 2018
 "Girls Night Out" (Debbie Gibson song), 2019
 "Girls Night Out" (The Judds song), 1985
 "Girls Nite Out" (Tyler Collins song), 1990
 "Girls Night Out", by Alda, 1998
 "Girls Night Out", by Bratz from the Rock Angelz film soundtrack, 2005
 "Girls Night Out", by FEMM from Femm-Isation, 2014
 "G.N.O. (Girls' Night Out)", by Miley Cyrus from Hannah Montana 2: Meet Miley Cyrus, 2007

Other music
 A Girl's Night Out, a 2008 series of charity concerts by Rihanna

Other uses
Girls Night Out, a 2006 short-story anthology edited by Alisa Valdes-Rodriguez
 Bachelorette party